Paisclo Solutions Corp is an American personnel recruitment agency founded in 2020 by Clemente Romero. The company is dedicated to the recruitment, selection and staffing for corporations in the United States.

It achieved effective and rapid growth, opening branches in Orlando, Miami and Tampa. Likewise, it was recognized in 2022 for its contribution to the Latino community in adapting and improving the quality of life of its employees.

Background 
P.A.I.S.C.L.O. are the initials of Pasión, Ambición, Iniciativa, Superación, Creatividad, Liderazgo y Organización (in English, Passion, Ambition, Initiative, Overcoming, Creativity, Leadership and Organization), values of the company founded by Clemente Romero in 2020. This company, whose headquarters are in Orlando, Florida, has achieved its success by valuing the work and the commitment of each of the employees, always seeking to improve their quality of life and provide them with all the benefits that correspond to them by law.

Its clients include Frontera Cocina By Disney Springs, Hilton, Wyndham Orlando, Hard Rock Cafe and Hyatt Regency, among others.

Headquarters 
Paisclo currently manages three established locations: Orlando, Miami and Tampa. The directors announced that soon, a new headquarters would be established in Georgia.

Awards and honours 

 2022: Leg Marketing Award: Best Latino Entrepreneur 
 2023: International Leader Awards for performance and quality

References 

Recruitment
Temporary employment agencies
Human resource management
Companies established in 2020
Companies of the United States
Pages with unreviewed translations